The  2015 Rally Australia was the tenth round of the 2015 World Rally Championship season. The rally was won by Sébastien Ogier.

Entry list

Overall standings

Special stages

Power Stage

References

Australia
Rally
Rally Australia
September 2015 sports events in Australia